The McKissack Ponds (sometimes misspelled as McKissick) are five small ponds in the city limits of Carrabelle, Franklin County, Florida, just west –  to  – of the Carrabelle–Thompson Airport, on the north and south sides of Airport Road. The McKissack Ponds are owned by Franklin County.

History

Locations 
Carrabelle is a coastal inland rural town, contiguous to St. George Sound (part of the Apalachee Bay system), just west of St. James Island, on the Gulf of Mexico's northeastern coast – sometimes referred to as "the Forgotten Coast" – in the Panhandle. The ponds are south of the Carrabelle River and west of U.S. Route 98 in an area called Carrabelle Beach, which was known before World War II as McKissack Beach. From another perspective, the ponds are  due north (and slightly west) of the southern tip of Dog Island.

 The largest pond – south of Lake Pristine, sometimes referred to as Big Lake McKissack – lies south of McKissack Lane (a road in another real estate subdivision), north of Airport Road (aka Franklin County Road 376).

Sections, townships, and ranges 
Under a United States Public Land Survey System, originally defined by the General Land Office, McKissack Ponds are located in:
 Sections 19 and 30, Township 7 South, Range 4 West, and
 Sections 24 and 25, Township 7 South, Range 5 West of the
Tallahassee meridian (a principal meridian).

1977 USGS designation 
The United States Geological Survey (USGS) Board on Geographic Names (BGN), in its mission to standardize geographic features, formally rendered a decision to recognize McKissack Ponds December 8, 1977.

Namesake 
McKissack is the surname of a family, long-time residents of the area, the first Floridian generation being William Crawford McKissack (born in Shorterville, Alabama; 1878–1958), a pharmacist and real estate developer who – with his wife, Mae Pickett (maiden; born in Apalachicola, Florida, 1879–1925) – moved from Shorterville to Carrabelle in 1903, and, for more than 50 years, in Carrabelle, operated a drugstore on Main Street – "The W.C. McKissack Drug Store." W.C. McKissack was often called "Doc" McKissack, though, he was not a medical doctor.  McKissack had purchased about 3,000 acres in the Carrabelle area. One of his grandsons, Luke McKissack (né Charles Luke McKissack; 1937–2010) was a notable civil rights lawyer in Los Angeles. One of his greatgrandaughters (Luke's daughter) is Lana McKissack (née Lana Cordezia McKissack; born 1984), a film actress and producer, who, since 2012, has been married to Nathan John Moore, Jr. (born 1880), also an actor and producer.

Maps 
 Nautical Chart 11404 (alternate link), National Oceanic and Atmospheric Administration (degrees, minutes, seconds: 29° 50' 0" 32.9928"; N 84° 41' W)

References 

Lakes of Florida
Lakes of Franklin County, Florida